Nyctaginia is a monotypic genus of flowering plants belonging to the family Nyctaginaceae. The only species is Nyctaginia capitata (devil's bouquet).

Its native range is Southern Central USA to Northeastern Mexico .

References

Nyctaginaceae
Monotypic Caryophyllales genera
Taxa named by Jacques Denys Choisy